Rogowo  (German Roggow) is a village in the administrative district of Gmina Stargard, within Stargard County, West Pomeranian Voivodeship, in north-western Poland.

The village has a population of 149.

Sports
The local football club is Dęby Rogowo. It competes in the lower leagues.

References

Rogowo